Teheivarii Ludivion (born 1 July 1989) is a Tahitian footballer who plays as a defender for AS Tefana in the Tahiti First Division. He represented his country in the 2009 FIFA U-20 World Cup and now is a full-time member of the Tahiti national football team.

International career
Ludivion made his debut with Tahiti national football team at 2010 Coupe de l'Outre-Mer. He was part of the team that won 2012 OFC Nations Cup and started all matches but the first. On 23 June 2013, Ludivion played against Uruguay in the 2013 Confederations Cup and was red carded when he was shown a second yellow card.

International career statistics

International goals

Honours
OFC Nations Cup: 2012

References

External links
http://www.zerozero.pt/jogador.php?id=114319&epoca_id=0&search=1&search_string=ludivion&menu=esc

1989 births
Living people
French Polynesian footballers
Tahiti international footballers
Association football defenders
2012 OFC Nations Cup players
2013 FIFA Confederations Cup players